Hindi Hai Hum is an Indian television series that aired on the new Indian channel Real TV. The music of the show is done by Dony Hazarika.

Plot
Hindi Hai Hum is the story about a girl named Bubbly from the small town of Nahan. She knows everything very well but is poor in English. Due to this, Rahul denies to marry her. Considering this, she decides to learn English. She reaches to Pereira English Academy to learn English.

Cast 
 Riddhi Dogra as Bubbly
 Deeya Chopra as Lovline
 Puneet Panjwani
 Karan Hukku

References

Real (TV channel) original programming
2009 Indian television series debuts
2009 Indian television series endings
Indian drama television series
Television shows set in Himachal Pradesh
Swastik Productions television series